Yadisleidy Pedroso (Havana, 28 January 1987) is an Italian hurdler. She competed at the 2020 Summer Olympics, in 400 m hurdles.

Biography
She has been an Italian citizen from 7 February 2013, but she was unable compete for the Italian national athletics team before 13 December 2013. Pedroso formerly represented Cuba and became an Italian citizen through her marriage to her coach Massimo Matrone.

National records
Italian records in athletics
 400 metres hurdles: 54.54 ( Shanghai, 18 May 2013) - Current holder

Achievements

National titles
He won five national championships.
 Italian Athletics Championships
 400 metres hurdles: 2013, 2014, 2015, 2017, 2018

See also
 Italian records in athletics
 Italian all-time lists - 400 metres hurdles
 List of eligibility transfers in athletics

References

External links
 

1987 births
Cuban female hurdlers
Italian female hurdlers
Living people
Athletes from Havana
Cuban emigrants to Italy
Naturalised citizens of Italy
World Athletics Championships athletes for Italy
Athletes (track and field) at the 2016 Summer Olympics
Athletes (track and field) at the 2020 Summer Olympics
Olympic athletes of Italy
Athletes (track and field) at the 2018 Mediterranean Games
Mediterranean Games gold medalists for Italy
Mediterranean Games medalists in athletics
Mediterranean Games gold medalists in athletics